Maria Sanchez was the defending champion, but she lost in the first round to Anna Tatishvili.

Shelby Rogers won the tournament, defeating Anna Tatishvili in the final, 6–2, 6–3.

Seeds

Main draw

Finals

Top half

Bottom half

References 
 Main draw

Coleman Vision Tennis Championships - Singles
Coleman Vision Tennis Championships
2013 Coleman Vision Tennis Championships